"Clair" is a song by Gilbert O'Sullivan, released in 1972 as the first single from his second album Back to Front. It was written by O'Sullivan and produced by Gordon Mills, and is one of O'Sullivan's biggest-selling singles.

Song details
The song is a love song from the point of view of a close family friend who babysits a young girl (actually the artist's manager's daughter), though for the first part of the song, the ambiguous words lead one to think that it is a romantic song from one adult to another. The brief instrumental introduction is the sound of O'Sullivan whistling before he begins his vocal. The real Clair was the three-year-old daughter of O'Sullivan's producer-manager, Gordon Mills, and his wife, the model Jo Waring. The little girl's giggling is heard at the end of this song. The "Uncle Ray" mentioned in the song is O'Sullivan himself, a reference to his real name of Raymond O'Sullivan.

The harmonica instrumental break in the song, played by Mills, modulates up a semitone, from A to B-Flat, before going back to A.

Cover versions
An Italian rendition in 1973 by the crooner Johnny Dorelli. 
A version by Singers Unlimited was sampled by producer J Dilla for the Slum Village song "Players". 
Another cover (in English) was recorded  in 2006 by French singer Laurent Voulzy on his album "La Septième Vague".

Chart performance

"Clair" was the number one single on the UK Singles Chart for two weeks in November 1972, and number one in Canada on the RPM 100 singles chart.  In late December, it peaked at number two on the Billboard Hot 100 in the US, behind both "Me and Mrs. Jones" by Billy Paul and "You're So Vain" by Carly Simon. "Clair" was also O'Sullivan's second and last number one hit on the U.S. Easy Listening chart, after "Alone Again (Naturally)".

Weekly singles charts

Year-end charts

See also
List of number-one singles of 1972 (Ireland)
List of number-one singles from the 1970s (UK)
List of number-one adult contemporary singles of 1972 (U.S.)

References

1972 songs
1972 singles
Gilbert O'Sullivan songs
UK Singles Chart number-one singles
Irish Singles Chart number-one singles
RPM Top Singles number-one singles
Number-one singles in Norway
Songs written by Gilbert O'Sullivan
MAM Records singles